The Pathfinder series is a completed series of novels by Orson Scott Card that is notable for its unusual fusion of the themes of science fiction and fantasy, with some elements of historical fiction. One significant aspect of the Pathfinder series is its uniquely complex but well documented set of time travel rules.

Plot 
The narrative follows the adventures of a young man named Rigg, an unknowing colonist of a planet called Garden in a seemingly medieval state of scientific advancement. Rigg, at first a fur trapper's apprentice who has been educated in nearly every skill by a mysterious figure claiming to be his father, prominently exhibits a seemingly magical ability to see "paths" (hence the series' title), or the physical traces of living entities through time, to his benefit. Rigg and his companions, a band of unlikely friends, young and old, who have similar time-altering abilities, travel across Garden through many varied societies and environments to use their talents for personal benefit and heroics.
The story line develops in parallel with another story which converges as the story of the colonization of Garden by Terrans some 11,000 years in the past.

Reception 
The series is critically acclaimed for its fast-paced, yet detailed, action, and the complex international power games that characterize much of Orson Scott Card's latest works. Some readers did complain that the ending of the series did feel "lazy" or weak, the writing uneven.

Books in the series
 Pathfinder (2010)
 Ruins (2012)
 Visitors (2014)

See also

List of works by Orson Scott Card

References

External links 
 The Pathfinder series on Goodreads
 

Book series introduced in 2010
Novels by Orson Scott Card
Novel series